Vivian Sørmeland (born 8 July 1985 in Osen), came 3rd in season 4 of Idol (Norway) in May 2006. Her boyfriend was season 4-winner Aleksander Denstad With

Idol Performances
Audition: "I wish" by Stevie Wonder 
Top 40: "Foolish Games" by Jewel 
Top 12: "Joe Dallesandro" by Briskeby 
Top 11: "Respect" by Aretha Franklin 
Top 10: "I Want You Back" by Jackson Five 
Top 9:  "Love Explains It All" by Venke Knutson 
Top 8:  "Nothing Else Matters" by Metallica 
Top 7:  "First Time" by Robin Beck 
Top 6:  "The Winner Takes It All" by ABBA 
Top 5:  "Big Spender" by Peggy Lee 
Top 4:  "Because Of You" by Kelly Clarkson 
Top 4:  "One" (duet with Aleksander Denstad With) by U2 and Mary J. Blige 
Top 3:  "Since U Been Gone" by Kelly Clarkson 
Top 3:  "Nothing Compares 2 U" by Sinéad O'Connor

External links
 Official website

1985 births
Living people
Idol (Norwegian TV series) participants
Norwegian pop singers
Musicians from Trondheim
21st-century Norwegian singers
21st-century Norwegian women singers
People from Osen